Dermitzakis is the surname of:

Emmanouil Dermitzakis (born 1972), Greek geneticist
Giannis Dermitzakis (born 1992), Greek footballer
Konstantinos Dermitzakis (born 1982), Greek footballer
Manolis Dermitzakis (born 1976), Greek footballer
Pavlos Dermitzakis (born 1969), Greek footballer